Frank Mannion is an Irish film producer, based in London.

Since 2002, he has run the film production company, Swipe Films.

He has produced or executive produced:

Mad Cows starring Joanna Lumley, Anna Friel, Mohamed Al Fayed, Jodie Kidd & Sophie Dahl
Divorcing Jack starring David Thewlis, Rachel Griffiths & Jason Isaacs
Grand Theft Parsons starring Johnny Knoxville & Christina Applegate 
In Prison My Whole Life with Colin Firth, Mumia Abu Jamal, Mos Def, Noam Chomsky, Snoop Dogg & Steve Earle (international sales agent)
Reverb (film) starring Leo Gregory and Eva Birthistle
Flourish (film) starring Jennifer Morrison and Leighton Meester
Jackboots on Whitehall starring Ewan McGregor, Richard E. Grant, Rosamund Pike & Tom Wilkinson

He has an LL.B. from Trinity College Dublin and an LL.M. from Trinity Hall Cambridge.

References

Living people
Irish film producers
Year of birth missing (living people)